The Rt. Rev. Wentworth Francis Wentworth-Sheilds (also spelt Shields; 2 April 1867 – 13 September 1944) was an Anglican bishop in the first half of the 20th century.

He was born in 1867, the eldest of two sons of engineer Francis Webb Sheilds and Adelaide Baker. Francis Wentworth-Sheilds was his younger brother. The family added the surname Wentworth in 1877. He was educated at St Paul's School in London and London University. Ordained in 1899, he began his ordained ministry with curacies at St John the Baptist's Plumstead and St George's, Bloomsbury, England.

Shortly after his marriage in April 1902, he sailed to Australia where he was initially Precentor of St Saviour's Cathedral, Goulburn and then Archdeacon of Wagga Wagga. Later he was Warden of Bishop's College, Goulburn, then Rector of St James', King Street, Sydney (1910-16) and then, later, the second Bishop of Armidale, a post he held for 13 years (1916-1929).

On his return to England he was Warden of St Deiniol's Library, Hawarden. He died on 12 September 1944.

Family
He married at the Palace chapel, Ripon, on 3 April 1902, Annie Carpenter, the daughter of William Boyd Carpenter, Bishop of Ripon, who officiated during the ceremony.

References

External links

Anglican archdeacons in Australia
Anglican bishops of Armidale
20th-century Anglican bishops in Australia
Alumni of the University of London
People educated at St Paul's School, London
1867 births
1944 deaths